A Lissajous curve , also known as Lissajous figure or Bowditch curve , is the graph of a system of parametric equations

 

which describe the superposition of two perpendicular oscillations in x and y directions of different angular frequency (a and b). The resulting family of curves was investigated by Nathaniel Bowditch  in 1815, and later in more detail in 1857 by Jules Antoine Lissajous (for whom it has been named). Such motions may be considered as a particular of kind of complex harmonic motion.

The appearance of the figure is sensitive to the ratio . For a ratio of 1, when the frequencies match a=b, the figure is an ellipse, with special cases including circles (radians) and lines. A small change to one of the frequencies will mean the x oscillation after one cycle will be slightly out of synchronization with the y motion and so the ellipse will fail to close and trace a curve slightly adjacent during the next orbit showing as a precession of the ellipse. The pattern closes if the frequencies are whole number ratios i.e.  is rational.  

Another simple Lissajous figure is the parabola. Again a small shift of one frequency from the ratio 2 will result in the trace not closing but performing multiple loops successively shifted only closing if the ratio is rational as before. A complex dense pattern may form see below.

The visual form of such curves is often suggestive of a three-dimensional knot, and indeed many kinds of knots, including those known as Lissajous knots, project to the plane as Lissajous figures.

Visually, the ratio  determines the number of "lobes" of the figure. Similarly, a ratio of  produces a figure with five horizontal lobes and four vertical lobes. Rational ratios produce closed (connected) or "still" figures, while irrational ratios produce figures that appear to rotate. The ratio  determines the relative width-to-height ratio of the curve. For example, a ratio of  produces a figure that is twice as wide as it is high. Finally, the value of  determines the apparent "rotation" angle of the figure, viewed as if it were actually a three-dimensional curve. For example,  produces  and  components that are exactly in phase, so the resulting figure appears as an apparent three-dimensional figure viewed from straight on (0°). In contrast, any non-zero  produces a figure that appears to be rotated, either as a left–right or an up–down rotation (depending on the ratio ).

Lissajous figures where ,  ( is a natural number) and

 

are Chebyshev polynomials of the first kind of degree . This property is exploited to produce a set of points, called Padua points, at which a function may be sampled in order to compute either a bivariate interpolation or quadrature of the function over the domain .

The relation of some Lissajous curves to Chebyshev polynomials is clearer to understand if the Lissajous curve which generates each of them is expressed using cosine functions rather than sine functions.

Examples

The animation shows the curve adaptation with continuously increasing  fraction from 0 to 1 in steps of 0.01.

Generation
Prior to modern electronic equipment, Lissajous curves could be generated mechanically by means of a harmonograph.

Practical application 
Lissajous curves can also be generated using an oscilloscope (as illustrated). An octopus circuit can be used to demonstrate the waveform images on an oscilloscope. Two phase-shifted sinusoid inputs are applied to the oscilloscope in X-Y mode and the phase relationship between the signals is presented as a Lissajous figure.

In the professional audio world, this method is used for realtime analysis of the phase relationship between the left and right channels of a stereo audio signal. On larger, more sophisticated audio mixing consoles an oscilloscope may be built-in for this purpose.

The beam in some versions traces out a lopsided figure-8 pattern on its side.

Application for the case of 

When the input to an LTI system is sinusoidal, the output is sinusoidal with the same frequency, but it may have a different amplitude and some phase shift. The aspect ratio of the resulting ellipse is a function of the phase shift between the input and output, with an aspect ratio of 1 (perfect circle) corresponding to a phase shift of ±90° and an aspect ratio of ∞ (a line) corresponding to a phase shift of 0° or 180°.

The figure below summarizes how the Lissajous figure changes over different phase shifts. The phase shifts are all negative so that delay semantics can be used with a causal LTI system (note that −270° is equivalent to +90°). The arrows show the direction of rotation of the Lissajous figure.

In engineering
A Lissajous curve is used in experimental tests to determine if a device may be properly categorized as a memristor. It is also used to compare two different electrical signals: a known reference signal and a signal to be tested.

In popular culture

In motion pictures

Lissajous figures were sometimes displayed on oscilloscopes meant to simulate high-tech equipment in science-fiction TV shows and movies in the 1960s and 1970s.

The title sequence by John Whitney for Alfred Hitchcock's 1958 feature film Vertigo is based on Lissajous figures.

Company logos

Lissajous figures are sometimes used in graphic design as logos. Examples include:
 The Australian Broadcasting Corporation
 The Lincoln Laboratory at MIT
 The University of Electro-Communications, Japan.
 Disney's Movies Anywhere streaming video application uses a stylized version of the curve
 Facebook's rebrand into Meta Platforms is also a Lissajous Curve, echoing the shape of a capital letter M.

In modern art

 The Dadaist artist Max Ernst painted Lissajous figures directly by swinging a punctured bucket of paint over a canvas.

See also
 Lissajous orbit
 Blackburn pendulum
 Lemniscate of Gerono
 Spirograph

Notes

External links
 Lissajous Curve at Mathworld

Interactive demos 
 3D Java applets depicting the construction of Lissajous curves in an oscilloscope:
 Tutorial from the NHMFL
 Physics applet by Chiu-king Ng
 Detailed Lissajous figures simulation Drawing Lissajous figures with interactive sliders in Javascript
Lissajous Curves: Interactive simulation of graphical representations of musical intervals and vibrating strings 
 Interactive Lissajous curve generator – Javascript applet using JSXGraph
 Animated Lissajous figures
  Wolfram Mathematica - Lissajous figures with interactive sliders in Wolfram mathematica

Plane curves
Trigonometry
Articles containing video clips